Xie Junmin (born  in Guangdong) is a Chinese male former water polo player. He was part of the China men's national water polo team. He was part of the gold medal winning team at the 2006 Asian Games and competed at the 2008 Summer Olympics. He also competed at the 2011 World Aquatics Championships and 2013 World Aquatics Championships.

References

External links
 Xie Junmin at 2008teamchina.olympic.cn
 
 

1983 births
Living people
Chinese male water polo players
Olympic water polo players of China
Water polo players at the 2008 Summer Olympics
Sportspeople from Guangdong
Asian Games medalists in water polo
Water polo players at the 2006 Asian Games
Water polo players at the 2010 Asian Games
Asian Games gold medalists for China
Asian Games silver medalists for China
Medalists at the 2006 Asian Games
Medalists at the 2010 Asian Games
21st-century Chinese people